Nikolay Innokentjevich Blagodatov (Russian: Николай Иннокентьевич Благодатов) is a famous Soviet Nonconformist Art collector in USSR and Russia. He is a member of the Section of Criticism and Art Criticism of the Saint Petersburg Union of Artists.

Biography 
Nikolay Blagodatov graduated from St. Petersburg State University of Water Communications in 1962. In 1975, he became interested in collecting works of modern art. At the moment, his collection of Soviet Nonconformist Art (1970-1990) is one of the most significant in Russia. Since 1979, he has been writing articles about art (more than 250 articles). As a collector, organizer and participant of more than 50 exhibitions, including 8 personal collections. He is a partner of the Saint Petersburg Union of Artists. 
He personally meets and with many representatives of Soviet Nonconformist Art.

Bibliography (selected) 

 Subjective spaces of the city. — Petersburg Art History Notebooks, issue 67, St. Petersburg: AIS, 2021. — pp. 66–68. (RUS) 
 Blagodatov N. City: Subjective Improvisations / City as an Artist's Subjectivity. Artist's book project. Catalog. Authors of the articles: Parygin A.B., Markov T.A., Klimova E.D., Borovsky A.D., Severyukhin D.Ya., Grigoryants E.I., Blagodatov N.I. (Rus & En) — Saint Petersburg: Ed. T. Markova. 2020. — 128 p. — S. 5. 
 Blagodatov N., Herman M., Dmitrenko A.; scientific hands. Petrova E. N. Alexey Stern. Graphics, painting, sculpture: Exhibition catalog (Rus & En). — Saint Petersburg: Palace Editions, 2004. — 144 p.
 Walking with memories // THE! — 2004. — No. 4.
 Art is a search, search is an art. — Neva, No. 2, 2002. — P. 253—255. (RUS).

References

Russian art patrons
Russian art collectors
Russian culture
Living people
1937 births